Zakharyevka is a rural locality (a selo) in Nekrasovsky Selsoviet of Belogorsky District, Amur Oblast, Russia. The population was 20 as of 2018. There is one street.

Geography 
Zakharyevka is located on the right bank of the Belaya River, 44 km south of Belogorsk (the district's administrative centre) by road. Nekrasovka is the nearest rural locality.

References 

Rural localities in Belogorsky District